Motor Launch ML-286  is a First World War submarine chaser built by Elco, that saw action with Royal Navy. It is also listed as one of the Little Ships that were used in the 1940, Dunkirk evacuation. It is currently in a very poor condition and lies on the banks of the River Thames at Isleworth Ait. ML-286 is the last surviving Royal Naval 'Motor Launch' of the more than 550 that served in the First World War.

World War I service
The first motor launches entered service in the First World War. These were 580  vessels built by the US Elco company for the Admiralty, receiving the designations ML-1 to ML-580. They served between 1916 and the end of the war with the Royal Navy defending the British coast from German submarines. 
Her first commander was the War artist, Lieutenant Geoffrey Allfree (1889–1918)

Dunkirk and post-war conversion to a house boat
After the War ML286 was sold off by the Ministry and was given the name Cordon Rouge and then later, in 1930 she became Eothen which was her name at Dunkirk. She returned to Ramsgate and towed to Teddington. She was requisitioned for service as an auxiliary patrol vessel in the Thames but found to be unsuitable, and later was returned to her owners in August 1940.

Current condition
Currently, Eothen (ML-286) lies in a very poor condition on the banks of the River Thames. It is being monitored and recorded by volunteer members of the Thames Discovery Programme (TDP) based at Museum of London Archaeology (MOLA).

See also
 Coastal Motor Boat
 Torpedo boat
 Harbour Defence Motor Launch
 Coastal Forces of the Royal Navy

References

Further reading

External links
"The Movies" – The Ships and Men of the Royal Navy Motor Launch Patrol, 1914–1919
World War 1 at Sea – list of Motor Launches or ML's built by Elco in World War 1
Forgotten Wrecks of the First War

1916 ships
Little Ships of Dunkirk
Isleworth
Transport on the River Thames
Ships built in Bayonne, New Jersey
Shipwrecks of the River Thames
Thames Estuary
Patrol vessels of the United Kingdom